Branch insignia of the Ukrainian Armed Forces refers to one of several military emblems that may be worn on the uniform of the Ukrainian Armed Forces to denote membership in a particular area of expertise.

History
Most insignia have been in use since independence in 1991. Many of these insignia are direct copies of their equivalents in the Soviet Armed Forces of the late 1980s to early 1990s. In July 2016, the Ukrainian Armed Forces introduced new insignia.

Branch of Service Insignia

2016-present 
The following are the branch insignia emblems of the Ukrainian Armed Forces used from 2016 to the present:

2007-2016 
The following are the branch insignia emblems of the Ukrainian Armed Forces used from 2007 to 2016:

References

External links
Branch Insignia

Branch Insignia